The 1985–86 English Hockey League season took place from September 1985 until May 1986.

The season culminated in the National Inter League Championship for men which brought together the winners of their respective regions. The Men's championship was won by East Grinstead

The Men's Hockey Association Cup was won by Southgate and the Women's Cup (National Club Championship finals) was won by Slough.

Men's National Inter League Championship finals 
(Held at Prescot, Merseyside, May 3–4)

Group A

Group B

Semi-finals & Final

Men's Cup (Hockey Association Cup)

Quarter-finals

Semi-finals

Final 
(Held at Willesden Sports Centre on 20 April)

Women's Cup (National Club Championship finals)

Groups 
(Held at Peterborough, April 19–20), Pool 1 was won by Ealing and Pool 2 was won by Slough.

Semi-finals

Final 
(Held at University of Essex, April 27)

References 

1985
field hockey
field hockey
1985 in field hockey
1986 in field hockey